Martin Damm and Radek Štěpánek were the defending champions.  Damm did not participate this year.  Štěpánek partnered with Mahesh Bhupathi, but withdrew from the first round.

Arnaud Clément and Michaël Llodra won in the final 7–5, 4–6, [10–8], against Mark Knowles and Daniel Nestor.

Seeds

Draw

Draw

References

External links
 Main draw

Open 13
Open 13 - Doubles
- Open 13 - Doubles